Dimitrios "Dimitris" Despos (born March 30, 1976) is a Greek professional basketball player. Despos has spent his entire playing career in the Greek professional leagues. He also represented Greece at the youth levels and won the gold medal in the 1993 FIBA Europe Under-16 Championship and the 1995 FIBA Under-19 World Cup. At a height of 2.10 m (6' 10") tall, he plays at the center position.

Professional career
Despos started playing basketball in the amateur club, Ikaroi Trikala, of his hometown, before moving to GS Larissa in 1994. In the 2007–08 season, while with MENT, Despos lead the Greek 2nd Division in rebounds, with 279 in 30 games. In July 2008, he signed with Peristeri. In 2011, Despos signed with AEK. He stayed with the team for three years, helping them to gain a league promotion to the Greek top-tier level. In September 2014, he signed with Iraklis of the Greek A2 (2nd Division). In a game against Filippos Veria, Despos exceeded 3,000 career points scored in the Greek 2nd Division.

In September 2016, Iraklis announced that Despos would play for the team in the 2016–17 season.

National team career
Despos represented the Greek Under-16 junior national team at the 1993 FIBA Europe Under-16 Championship, where Greek the team won the gold medal. He was also a member of the Greek Under-19 junior national team that won the gold medal at the 1995 FIBA Under-19 World Cup. During the tournament, he appeared in 4 games, averaging 2.5 points and 2.8 rebounds per game. Despos represented Greece at the youth levels in 91 games, averaging 4.8 points per game.

References

External links
EuroCup Profile
FIBA.com Profile (archive)
FIBA Europe Profile
Eurobasket.com Profile
AEK Profile
DraftExpress.com Profile
RealGM.com Profile
Insports.eu Profile 

1976 births
Living people
AEK B.C. players
Centers (basketball)
Greek men's basketball players
Greek Basket League players
Gymnastikos S. Larissas B.C. players
Iraklis Thessaloniki B.C. players
Makedonikos B.C. players
Maroussi B.C. players
MENT B.C. players
P.A.O.K. BC players
Peristeri B.C. players
Basketball players from Trikala